Hanson is a home rule-class city in Hopkins County, Kentucky, in the United States. The population was 742 at the 2010 census, up from 625 at the 2000 census.

The Hanson Historic District is located in the city. The companies that supply power to Hanson residents are Kentucky Utilities and Kenergy.

History
The town was founded in 1869 on a  grant from two local landowners, judge Robert Eastwood and pastor Roland Gooch, in order to function as a stop on the Evansville, Henderson, and Nashville Railroad. The city was laid out by (and named for) a railway's engineer and surveyor named Henry B. Hanson. The community received its post office on December 7, 1869, and was incorporated by the state assembly on March 31, 1873.

The Evansville, Henderson, & Nashville was purchased by the St. Louis and Southeastern in 1872, which (following a reorganization) was purchased in turn by the L&N in 1879.

The city was essentially destroyed by a fire in 1889, and the present historic district dates from the rebuilding that followed. Today, the former L&N network makes up part of CSX Transportation, which operates a siding track in Hanson.

Geography
Hanson is located in northern Hopkins County at  (37.417794, -87.480647). U.S. Route 41 (Hanson Road) passes through the center of town, and Interstate 69 passes through the eastern part, with access from Exit 120.

Demographics

As of the census of 2000, there were 625 people, 241 households, and 187 families residing in the city. The racial makeup of the city was 97.76% White, 0.48% Black or African American, 0.96% Asian, and 0.80% from two or more races. Hispanic or Latino of any race were 0.64% of the population.

There were 241 households, out of which 38.6% had children under the age of 18 living with them, 66.8% were married couples living together, 7.9% had a female householder with no husband present, and 22.0% were non-families. 19.5% of all households were made up of individuals, and 10.4% had someone living alone who was 65 years of age or older. The average household size was 2.59 and the average family size was 2.90.

In the city, the population was spread out, with 26.2% under the age of 18, 6.4% from 18 to 24, 29.3% from 25 to 44, 26.6% from 45 to 64, and 11.5% who were 65 years of age or older. The median age was 39 years. For every 100 females, there were 92.9 males. For every 100 females age 18 and over, there were 89.7 males.

The median income for a household in the city was $31,250, and the median income for a family was $36,406. Males had a median income of $32,054 versus $21,731 for females. The per capita income for the city was $14,932. About 6.7% of families and 12.5% of the population were below the poverty line, including 11.3% of those under age 18 and 16.1% of those age 65 or over.

References

External links
 City of Hanson official website

Cities in Kentucky
Cities in Hopkins County, Kentucky
Populated places established in 1873